Posts and Telecommunications Institute of Technology, Ho Chi Minh City is a university-like institute in Ho Chi Minh City, Vietnam. The institute is located at 11, Nguyen Dinh Chieu Street, District 1, Ho Chi Minh City. The institute is a university providing university undergraduate, graduate and postgraduate level education in telecommunication and electronics, IT fields. There are 5 faculties: Basic, Business Administration, Telecommunication, Electronics, IT.

External links
Official Website of PTIT HCMC
PTIT HCMC website

Universities in Ho Chi Minh City